The Women's road race of the 2014 UCI Road World Championships took place in and around Ponferrada, Spain on 27 September 2014. Marianne Vos was the defending champion, having won the world title in 2012 and 2013.

The world title was won by France's Pauline Ferrand-Prévot in a sprint finish, becoming the first French woman since Jeannie Longo in 1995 to win the women's world title. The silver medal went to Germany's Lisa Brennauer – the world time trial champion – having narrowly been beaten by Ferrand-Prévot in a photo finish, while Emma Johansson of Sweden won the bronze medal. Vos could only finish tenth in the race – the first time since the 2005 Championships that Vos had not won a medal – after her attack on the final climb (along with Johansson, Lizzie Armitstead and Elisa Longo Borghini) was negated in the closing kilometres, which led to a regrouping of 15 riders prior to the final sprint.

Qualification

Qualification was based mainly on the 2014 UCI Nation Ranking as of 15 August 2014. The first five nations in this classification qualified seven riders to start, the next ten nations qualified six riders to start and the next five nations qualified five riders to start. Other nations and non ranked nations had the possibility to send three riders to start.

  (7)
  (7)
  (7)
  (7)
  (7)
  (6)
  (6)
  (6)
  (6)
  (6)
  (6)
  (6)
  (6)
  (6)
  (6)
  (5)
  (5)
  (5)
  (5)
  (5)
 Other nations (3)

Moreover, the outgoing World Champion and continental champions were also able to take part in the race on top of the nation numbers.

Course
The race was held on the same circuit as the other road races and consisted of seven laps.

The first  were flat, after which the climb to Alto de Montearenas started, with an average gradient of 8%. After a few hundred metres the ascent flattened and the remaining  were at an average gradient of 3.5%. Next was a descent, with the steepest point after  at a 16% negative gradient.

Schedule
All times are in Central European Time (UTC+1).

Participating nations
134 cyclists from 39 nations took part in the women's road race. The numbers of cyclists per nation are shown in parentheses.

  Australia (6)
  Austria (2)
  Belgium (6)
  Belarus (2)
  Brazil (3)
  Canada (4)
  Colombia (2)
  Croatia (2)
  Czech Republic (1)
  Denmark (1)
  Estonia (2)
  Finland (2)
  France (6)
  Germany (7)
  Great Britain (6)
  Greece (1)
  Hungary (2)
  Israel (2)
  Italy (7)
  Japan (2)
  Latvia (2)
  Lithuania (3)
  Luxembourg (1)
  Mexico (2)
  Netherlands (9)
  New Zealand (4)
  Norway (3)
  Poland (6)
  Portugal (1)
  Romania (1)
  Russia (6)
  Saint Kitts and Nevis (1)
  Slovenia (3)
  South Africa (3)
  Spain (3) (host)
  Sweden (6)
  Switzerland (5)
  Ukraine (2)
  United States (7)

Prize money
The UCI assigned premiums for the top 3 finishers, with a total prize money of €16,101.

Results

Final classification

Riders who failed to finish
75 riders failed to finish the race.

References

Women's road race
UCI Road World Championships – Women's road race
2014 in women's road cycling